The King's Christian School is a private school located in Cherry Hill, in Camden County, New Jersey, United States, that serves students in pre-kindergarten through twelfth grade. King's is owned and operated by 'The Association of The King's Christian School,' a non-profit organization governed by a board of directors and made up of the parents and friends of the school; it is not associated with any particular main-line Protestant denomination or church.

Founded as the Christian Day School of Camden County, the school opened in 1946 at Immanuel Presbyterian Church in the West Collingswood section of Haddon Township, New Jersey.

The King's Christian School is approved under the authority of the New Jersey Department of Education and is accredited by the Association of Christian Schools International and by the Middle States Association of Colleges and Schools Commission on Elementary and Secondary Schools (through July 2028).

King's offers a fully integrated college preparatory curriculum with an evangelical Christian worldview and required Biblical education at all grade levels.

As of the 2019–20 school year, the school had an enrollment of 242 students and 31.3 classroom teachers (on an FTE basis), for a student–teacher ratio of 7.7:1.

Location
King's is currently housed on a single campus for pre-kindergarten to 12th grade students at 5 Carnegie Plaza, Cherry Hill, New Jersey.

Former locations
Former King's sites include 800 W. King's Highway, Haddon Heights, New Jersey, where the Christian Day School of Camden County met in an historic mansion beginning around 1951. A modern school built here in 1970 now houses the Brookfield Academy's elementary school.

In 1974, the school's Hainesport, New Jersey elementary school campus opened at Easton Union Church. This campus ceased operation in 1992.

In 1983, the new high school relocated to the Barclay School in the Barclay Farm neighborhood, Cherry Hill, New Jersey. The Cherry Hill Public School District now operates this site as the Barclay Early Childhood Center.

King's high school was temporarily housed at the Sacred Heart School, Mount Ephraim, New Jersey, between 1999 and 2003.

Other meeting sites have included: Fairview Community Baptist Church, Camden, New Jersey; Haddon Heights Baptist Church, Haddon Heights, New Jersey; Mt. Calvary Union Church, Runnemede, New Jersey; Orthodox Presbyterian Church, Bellmawr, New Jersey; Moorestown Public School, Moorestown, New Jersey.

References

External links
 

1946 establishments in New Jersey
Cherry Hill, New Jersey
Educational institutions established in 1946
Middle States Commission on Secondary Schools
Private elementary schools in New Jersey
Private high schools in Camden County, New Jersey
Private middle schools in New Jersey